Anna Cockrell (born August 28, 1997) is an American track and field athlete competing in sprinting and hurdling. She is a two-time medalist at the 2019 Pan American Games in Lima, Peru and she represented the United States at the 2020 Summer Olympics in Tokyo, Japan.

Early life 
Cockrell was born on August 28, 1997 in San Ramon, California to Serena and Keith Cockrell as the youngest of three children. She comes from a family of athletes: her father played football at Columbia University, her older brother, Ross, is a cornerback for the Tampa Bay Buccaneers, and her older sister, Ciera, played volleyball at Davidson College.

High school 
Cockrell attended Providence Day School in Charlotte, North Carolina, graduating in 2016. She competed within the school’s high school track and field program led by coach Carol Lawrence. In 2016, she won the gold medal in the women's 400 metres hurdles event, with a personal best of 55.20s, at the 2016 IAAF World U20 Championships held in Bydgoszcz, Poland. She also won the gold medal in the women's 4×400 metres relay event.

Career

2017–2021: USC Trojans 
In June 2019, Cockrell became the NCAA champion at the year's NCAA championships for the women's 400-meter hurdle event with a time of 55.23 after being a runner-up in each of the two years prior. In August 2019, she won the silver medal in the women's 400 metres hurdles event and the gold medal in the women's 4×400 metres relay event at the 2019 Pan American Games held in Lima, Peru.

In May 2021, Cockrell was named the 2021 Pac-12 Women's Track & Field Scholar Athlete of the Year before helping to lead her school to a third consecutive conference team title at the 2021 Pac-12 championships by winning the women's 100-meter and 400-meter hurdles events. The following month, after the cancellation of the prior year's competition due to the COVID-19 pandemic, Cockrell became the 2021 NCAA champion for the women's 100-meter hurdles and 400-meter hurdles events to help drive her school to win the team title at the 2021 NCAA Division I Outdoor Track and Field Championships. She ran the 100-meter hurdles with a time of 12.58 and the 400-meter hurdles with a time of 54.68 and became the second woman in history to win both events in the same season at the NCAA championships. Her achievements led her to receive the 2021 Honda Sports Award for track and field and the Pac-12's Tom Hansen Conference Medal for the year.

Cockrell graduated from the University of Southern California in 2019 with a bachelor's degree in communications from the Annenberg School and a minor in political science. She went on to earn her master's in public policy with a certificate in public policy advocacy in 2021.

2020 Summer Olympics 
At the 2020 United States Olympic Trials for track and field on June 27, 2021, Cockrell placed third in the women's 400-meter hurdles event to qualify for the team alongside Sydney McLaughlin and Dalilah Muhammad. She broke her personal and school record in the 400-metre hurdles event with a time of 53.70, ahead of the previous record she set at the 2021 NCAA championships.

At the Olympics, Cockrell qualified for the semifinals after coming in third in her heat race with a time of 55.37. She later finished in second place with a time of 54.17 in the semifinals, landing her a spot in the final. In the final, Cockrell appeared to finish seventh, but was later disqualified after officials discovered she had made a lane violation.

Personal life 
Cockrell has been an outspoken advocate for the mental health of student-athletes after suffering a hamstring injury on the first day of the 2019 NCAA Division I Indoor Track and Field Championships in which she blamed herself for her school's loss in the team competition. After exhibiting severe symptoms of depression and suicidal tendencies, she eventually sought assistance from her friends, her head coach, and a sports psychologist, all of whom she thanked in her student-athlete graduation speech at USC that later went viral.

References

External links 
 
 
 
 
 

Living people
1997 births
American female sprinters
American female hurdlers
Athletes (track and field) at the 2019 Pan American Games
Medalists at the 2019 Pan American Games
Pan American Games gold medalists for the United States
Pan American Games silver medalists for the United States
Pan American Games medalists in athletics (track and field)
Pan American Games track and field athletes for the United States
USC Trojans women's track and field athletes
African-American track and field athletes
Track and field athletes from North Carolina
Athletes (track and field) at the 2020 Summer Olympics
Olympic track and field athletes of the United States
Sportspeople from Charlotte, North Carolina
21st-century African-American sportspeople
21st-century African-American women